Tim Brunero (born 1976) is known to the Australian television-viewing public as the runner-up of Big Brother Australia 2005.

Brunero visited East Timor in November 2005 for APHEDA, also known as Union Aid Abroad. He was also involved with the ACTU's Your Rights at Work campaign as a high-profile spokesman, delivering speeches at rallies such as the Australian industrial relations legislation national day of protest, 2005.

Brunero formerly wrote for The Chaser. He also writes articles on the Church of Scientology for many online websites. Most recently he joined John Singleton's 2GB-plus, the digital radio service from the Australian radio station 2GB, as a presenter.

In 2009, Tim Brunero returned to the small screen in Sydney in a new series of the community television show Dare I Ask?, produced by Metro Screen and broadcast on TVS.

Brunero is also a regular politics and entertainment reporter, and an opinion writer, for LIVENEWS.com.au - the Macquarie National News online news service.

Tim Brunero went to Carlingford High School, is a graduate of the University of Sydney and was a director of the University of Sydney Union.

He has formerly worked at Sydney community radio station 2SER 107.3FM hosting the Wednesday breakfast program, where his insightful comments have endeared him to listeners as the station's own Hunter S. Thompson.

Currently he is presenting the Drive program on 783 ABC Alice Springs.

References

External links
Tim Brunero's official website
Tim Brunero's blog about Big Brother

Australian journalists
Big Brother (Australian TV series) contestants
Living people
1976 births
University of Sydney alumni